Admiral Spencer may refer to:

Frederick Spencer, 4th Earl Spencer (1798–1857), British Royal Navy vice admiral
Lyndon Spencer (1898–1981), U.S. Coast Guard vice admiral
Peter Spencer (Royal Navy officer) (born 1947), British Royal Navy vice admiral